Kongnapa (or Gonnapar) Weerasakreck is a Thai Muay Thai fighter and kickboxer. He is the former K-1 Lightweight champion and former Krush Lightweight champion.

After having over a hundred fights in Thailand, Gonnapar moved to Japan in 2010.

As of May 2020, he is the #2 ranked super bantamweight in the world, according to Combat Press.

Kickboxing career
Gonnapar made his kickboxing debut against Hideaki Yamazaki in September 2016, a fight which he won by unanimous decision. Before that, he fought in muay thai, winning the WMPF World Super Lightweight title and successfully defending it twice.

Gonnapar participated in the 2017 K-1 Lightweight Grand Prix. In the quarterfinals, he won a unanimous decision against Koya Urabe, but lost the semifinal bout against Ren Hiramoto by a first round knockout.

In June 2017, Gonnapar fought Wei Rui for the K-1 Lightweight title. Rui won the fight by majority decision. 

Gonnapar rebounded from this loss with a three fight winning streak, defeating Pan Ryunson by unanimous decision, Kenta Hayashi by a first round knockout and Katsuki Ishida by a second round knockout. This streak earned him the chance to fight Daizo Sasaki for the Krush Lightweight title at Krush 87. Gonnapar won the fight by unanimous decision. He defended the title thrice, winning a unanimous decision against Fumiya Osawa at Krush 93, Takumi Yokoyama by majority decision at Krush 110, and Yuto Shinohara by unanimous decision at Krush 113. On March 1, 2021, Gonnapar vacated his Krush title in order to focus on his K-1 title.

K-1 Lightweight Champion
At K-1 World GP 2020 Winter's Crucial Bout, Gonnapar fought Kenta Hayashi for the K-1 Lightweight title. He won the fight by majority decision.

Gonnapar faced Daiki Nagumo at K-1 World GP 2021: K’Festa 4 Day.2 on March 28, 2021 in a non-title bout. He won the fight via second-round knockout.

In his first title defense, Gonnapar is expected to face Taio Asahisa at K-1 World Grand Prix 2021. He lost the fight by an extra round split decision.

Post-title reign
Gonnapar was scheduled to face Yuma Saikyo at K-1 World GP 2021 in Osaka on December 4, 2021. He won the fight by majority decision.

Gonnapar was booked to face Shoya Suzuki at K-1: K'Festa 5 on April 3, 2022. He won the fight by first round knockout.

Titles and accomplishments
World Professional Muaythai Federation
 2015 WMPF World Super Lightweight Champion
Two successful title defenses

Krush
 2018 Krush Lightweight Champion (one time; former)
Three successful title defenses

K-1
 2020 K-1 World GP Lightweight Champion (one time; former)

Awards
 2020 Combat Press "Breakout Fighter of the Year"

Fight record

|-  style="background:#cfc"
| 2022-08-11|| Win ||align=left| Hiroto Iwasaki ||  K-1 World GP 2022 in Fukuoka || Fukuoka, Japan || TKO (Doctor stoppage)|| 1 ||3:00
|-  style="text-align:center; background:#cfc"
| 2022-06-19 ||Win||align=left| Taiju Shiratori || THE MATCH 2022 || Tokyo, Japan ||TKO (Right hook)||1||2:42
|- style="background:#cfc" 
| 2022-04-03 || Win||align=left| Shoya Suzuki || K-1: K'Festa 5 || Tokyo, Japan || KO (Jumping knee) || 1 ||2:13
|-  style="text-align:center; background:#cfc"
| 2021-12-04 ||Win || align=left| Yuma Saikyo || K-1 World GP 2021 in Osaka || Osaka, Japan || Decision (Majority) || 3 ||3:00
|-  style="background:#fbb;"
| 2021-07-17 || Loss || align=left| Taio Asahisa ||  K-1 World GP 2021 in Fukuoka || Fukuoka, Japan || Ext.R Decision (Split) ||4 ||3:00  
|-
! style=background:white colspan=9 |
|-  style="background:#cfc;"
| 2021-03-28|| Win ||align=left| Daiki Nagumo || K-1 World GP 2021: K’Festa 4 Day.2 || Tokyo, Japan || KO (Punches) || 2 || 1:31
|-  style="background:#cfc;"
| 2020-12-13|| Win || align=left| Kenta Hayashi || K-1 World GP 2020 Winter's Crucial Bout|| Tokyo, Japan || Decision (Majority) || 3 || 3:00
|-
! style=background:white colspan=9 |
|-  style="background:#cfc;"
| 2020-06-28|| Win ||align=left| Yuto Shinohara || Krush.113 || Tokyo, Japan ||Decision (Unanimous)|| 3 || 3:00
|-
! style=background:white colspan=9 |
|-  style="background:#cfc;"
| 2020-01-25|| Win ||align=left| Takumi Yokoyama || Krush 110 || Tokyo, Japan || Decision (Majority)|| 3 || 3:00
|-
! style=background:white colspan=9 |
|-style="background:#cfc;"
| 2019-03-10|| Win|| align=left| Liu Wei ||K-1 World GP 2019: K’FESTA 2 || Saitama, Japan || Decision (Unanimous)|| 3 || 3:00
|-style="background:#FFBBBB;"
| 2018-12-08|| Loss || align=left| Yuto Shinohara || K-1 World GP 2018: K-1 Lightweight World's Strongest Tournament, Quarter Finals || Osaka, Japan || KO (2 Knockdowns/Left Hook) || 1 || 0:25
|-  style="background:#CCFFCC;"
| 2018-09-30|| Win ||align=left| Fumiya Osawa || Krush.93 || Tokyo, Japan || Decision (Unanimous)|| 3 || 3:00
|-
! style=background:white colspan=9 |
|-  style="background:#CCFFCC;"
| 2018-06-17|| Win ||align=left| Rukiya Anpo || K-1 World GP 2018: 2nd Featherweight Championship Tournament || Saitama, Japan || KO (Left Straight) || 2 || 1:48
|-  style="background:#CCFFCC;"
| 2018-04-22|| Win ||align=left| Daizo Sasaki || Krush.87 || Tokyo, Japan || Decision (Unanimous)|| 3 || 3:00
|-
! style=background:white colspan=9 |
|-  style="background:#CCFFCC;"
| 2018-02-12|| Win ||align=left| Katsuki Ishida ||  Krush.85 || Tokyo, Japan || KO (Jumping Knee) || 2|| 2:22
|-  style="background:#CCFFCC;"
| 2017-11-05|| Win ||align=left| Kenta Hayashi ||Krush.82 –63 kg Tournament Semi Finals|| Tokyo, Japan || KO (Right Hook)  || 1 || 2:07
|-  style="background:#CCFFCC;"
| 2017-09-18|| Win ||align=left| Pan Ryunson || M-ONE 2017 2nd || Tokyo, Japan || Decision (Unanimous) || 3|| 3:00
|-
! style=background:white colspan=9 |
|-  style="background:#FFBBBB;"
| 2017-06-18 || Loss || align=left| Wei Rui || K-1 World GP 2017 Super Middleweight Championship Tournament || Tokyo, Japan || Decision (Majority) || 3 || 3:00
|-
! style=background:white colspan=9 |
|-  style="background:#FFBBBB;"
| 2017-02-25|| Loss || align=left| Ren Hiramoto || K-1 World GP 2017 Lightweight Championship Tournament, Semi Finals || Tokyo, Japan || KO (Left Cross) || 1 || 1:14
|-  style="background:#CCFFCC;"
| 2017-02-25|| Win ||align=left| Koya Urabe || K-1 World GP 2017 Lightweight Championship Tournament, Quarter Finals || Tokyo, Japan|| Decision (Unanimous) || 3 || 3:00
|-  style="background:#CCFFCC;"
| 2016-11-23|| Win ||align=left| Tatsuya Ishii || M-ONE 2016 FINAL || Tokyo, Japan || TKO (Doctor Stoppage)|| 4 || 1:39
|-
! style=background:white colspan=9 |
|-  style="background:#CCFFCC;"
| 2016-09-25|| Win ||align=left| Kiatphet Giakkonphet || M-ONE 2016 3rd || Tokyo, Japan || TKO (Left Middle Kick)|| 2 || 1:37
|-  style="background:#CCFFCC;"
| 2016-09-19 || Win ||align=left| Hideaki Yamazaki  || K-1 World GP 2016 -60kg World Tournament || Tokyo, Japan ||Decision (Unanimous) || 3 || 3:00
|-  style="background:#CCFFCC;"
| 2016-06-19|| Win ||align=left| UMA || M-ONE 2016 vol.2 || Tokyo, Japan || Decision (Unanimous) || 5 || 3:00
|-  style="background:#FFBBBB;"
| 2016-03-21|| Loss ||align=left| Kenta || M-ONE || Tokyo, Japan || Decision (Majority) || 5 || 3:00
|-  style="background:#CCFFCC;"
| 2016-02-07|| Win ||align=left| Tomoya Yamato || NKB Bushi Series VOL.1|| Tokyo, Japan || Decision (Unanimous) || 5 || 3:00
|-  style="background:#CCFFCC;"
| 2015-11-29|| Win ||align=left| Yasuyuki || HOOST CUP KINGS WEST 2 || Osaka, Japan || Decision (Unanimous) || 5 || 3:00
|-  style="background:#CCFFCC;"
| 2015-09-27|| Win ||align=left| Hachimaki || SUK WEERASAKRECK X || Tokyo, Japan || Decision (Unanimous) || 5 || 3:00
|-  style="background:#CCFFCC;"
| 2015-06-14|| Win ||align=left| Tsuyoshi Kato || SUK WEERASAKRECK IX || Tokyo, Japan || TKO (Low kicks) || 3 || 1:12
|-
! style=background:white colspan=9 |
|-  style="background:#CCFFCC;"
| 2015-04-19|| Win ||align=left| Shinji Suzuki || WPMF JAPAN × REBELS.35 || Tokyo, Japan || TKO (Doctor Stoppage) || 2 || 2:46
|-  style="background:#CCFFCC;"
| 2015-01-25|| Win ||align=left| Takuya "T-98" Imamura || REBELS.33 || Tokyo, Japan || TKO (Doctor Stoppage) || 3 || 0:55
|-  style="background:#CCFFCC;"
| 2014-09-21|| Win ||align=left| Hideo || M-FIGHT Suk WEERASAKRECK VII || Tokyo, Japan || TKO (Left middle kick) || 4 || 2:04
|-  style="background:#CCFFCC;"
| 2014-03-30|| Win ||align=left| Yosuke Mizuochi || M-FIGHT SUK WEERASAKRECK V || Tokyo, Japan || TKO (High kicks) || 2 ||
|-  style="background:#FFBBBB;"
| 2013-11-17|| Loss ||align=left| Hakeem Dawodu || M-FIGHT SUK WEERASAKRECK IV || Tokyo, Japan || TKO (Punches)|| 3 || 2:36
|-  style="background:#CCFFCC;"
| 2013-09-15|| Win ||align=left| Hidekazu Tanaka || M-FIGHT SUK WEERASAKRECK III Part.2 || Tokyo, Japan || Decision || 3 || 3:00
|-  style="background:#CCFFCC;"
| 2013-03-25|| Win ||align=left| Shingen Endo || M-FIGHT Suk WEERASAKRECK I || Tokyo, Japan || KO (Left body kick) || 3 || 0:35
|-  style="background:#CCFFCC;"
| 2013-01-06|| Win ||align=left| Chemical☆Shunta || RISE INFINITY.II || Tokyo, Japan || Decision (Unanimous)|| 3 || 3:00
|-  style="background:#cfc;"
| 2012-02-26|| Win||align=left| Tuanpae Sitsampayak ||  || Thailand || Decision || 5 || 3:00
|-  style="background:#FFBBBB;"
| 2011-02-20|| Loss||align=left| Lak Acegym || Muay Lok 2011～1st～ || Tokyo, Japan || Decision (Majority) || 3 || 3:00
|-  style="background:#cfc;"
| 2010-11-06|| Win||align=left| Yuki Noro || NKB THE SUPER KICKBOXING STEP UP! || Bangkok, Thailand || KO (Right elbow) || 3 || 1:23
|-  style="background:#cfc;"
| 2010-07-31|| Win||align=left| Phetsutin Sor.Boonliang || Lumpinee Stadium || Bangkok, Thailand || KO || 3 ||
|-  style="background:#cfc;"
| 2009-04-23|| Win||align=left| Rawut Tor.Saenchai || Rajadamnern Stadium || Bangkok, Thailand || Decision || 5 || 3:00
|-
| colspan=9 | Legend:

See also
 List of male kickboxers
 List of K-1 champions

References

Living people
1992 births
Kongnapa Weerasakreck
Bantamweight kickboxers
Thai expatriates in Japan
Thai expatriate sportspeople in Japan
Kongnapa Weerasakreck